The 1989 BCE International Open was a professional ranking snooker tournament that took place in September 1989 at Trentham Gardens in Stoke-on-Trent, England.

Steve Davis retained the title by defeating Stephen Hendry 9–4 in the final.


Main draw

References

Scottish Open (snooker)
International Open
International Open
International Open
Sport in Stoke-on-Trent